"Grey Riders" is a song performed by Grammy Award winning artist Neil Young. It is track 12 on Young's A Treasure, and the one song on the album that was released as a single.

References

2011 singles
Neil Young songs
1985 songs
Songs written by Neil Young